G4S Secure Solutions (Društvo za privatno obezbeđenje G4S Secure Solutions d.o.o) is a Serbian security company specialized in guarding, monitoring, cash handling, analyzing-consulting, security education and in sale of security systems.

History
It was founded under the name Progard Securitas in 1992 by former Deputy Chief of Belgrade Police Department, Miroslav Gojković.

In May 2008, G4S acquired an 85% shareholding in the company.

References

Companies based in Belgrade
Business services companies established in 1992
D.o.o. companies in Serbia
G4S
Security companies of Serbia
Serbian companies established in 1992